Arrastra Creek is a stream in the U.S. state of Oregon. It is a tributary to Wagner Creek.

Arrastra Creek was named after the arrastra, a piece of mining equipment.

References

Rivers of Oregon
Rivers of Jackson County, Oregon